is a Japanese wrestler. He competed in the men's Greco-Roman heavyweight at the 1960 Summer Olympics.

References

1934 births
Living people
Japanese male sport wrestlers
Olympic wrestlers of Japan
Wrestlers at the 1960 Summer Olympics
People from Fukuoka
20th-century Japanese people